Sociology is the study of society and culture.

Sociology may also refer to:

 Sociology (journal)
 The sociology associated with a specific field of study
  …
 The sociology within a particular society
  …

See also